State elections were held in South Australia on 11 December 1993. All 47 seats in the South Australian House of Assembly were up for election. The incumbent Australian Labor Party led by Premier of South Australia Lynn Arnold was defeated by the Liberal Party of Australia led by Leader of the Opposition Dean Brown.  The Liberals won what is still the largest majority government in South Australian history.

Background
The campaign was dominated by the issue of the collapse of the State Bank of South Australia in 1991. The State Bank's deposits were legally underwritten by the Government of South Australia, putting South Australia into billions of dollars of debt. Labor premier John Bannon had resigned over the issue in 1992, being replaced by Lynn Arnold just over a year before the election. The Liberals also changed leaders in 1992, switching from Dale Baker to Dean Brown. Following the Labor leadership change and by early 1993, Newspoll had recorded a total rise of 13 percent in the Labor primary vote.   However, the gains did not last.  A warning sign of things to come came with the March 1993 federal election, which saw two of Labor's longest-held seats in South Australia, Hindmarsh and Grey, fall to the Liberals.  Hindmarsh had been in Labor hands without interruption since 1919, while Grey had been in Labor hands for all but one term since 1943.

Key dates
 Issue of writ: 4 November 1993
 Close of electoral rolls: 12 November 1993
 Close of nominations: Friday 19 November 1993, at noon
 Polling day: 11 December 1993
 Return of writ: On or before 7 January 1994

Results

House of Assembly

 

|}

The Liberals under Dean Brown went into the election as unbackable favourites, and swept the 11-year Labor government from power in a massive landslide.  They won 37 of 47 seats (78.7 percent of the available seats, a majority of 14) in the South Australian House of Assembly from a 15-seat swing − in terms of seat count and percentage of seats won, the largest majority government in the state's history.  By comparison, Sir Thomas Playford never governed with more than 23 seats in a 39-seat legislature during his record 27 years as Premier, and Don Dunstan never governed with more than 27 seats in a 47-seat legislature.

The Liberals won 60.9 percent of the two-party vote, the largest two-party preferred vote in South Australian state history (dating back to the first statewide two-party calculations from 1944). Labor fell to just 39.1 percent of the two-party vote from a two-party swing of 8.9 percent—at the time, the largest two-party swing in South Australian state history (second only to the 9.4 percent swing at the following 1997 election, and still the largest that resulted in a change of government. The 15-seat swing is still the largest in South Australian state history.

Adelaide, which had been Labor's power base in the state for decades, swung over dramatically to support the Liberals.  Labor lost seats in several parts of Adelaide where it had not been seriously threatened in memory, and was cut down to only nine seats in the capital. Additionally, Labor suffered what proved to be permanent swings in much of country South Australia; it was cut down to only one seat outside of Adelaide, the Whyalla-based seat of Giles.

The stratospheric records for seat count and percentage of seats in the House led to predictions of a generation of Liberal government.  However, the Liberal gains were short lived.  Factional stoushes between the moderate and conservative wings of the Liberal Party led to Brown's factional rival, John Olsen, successfully challenging Brown for the Liberal leadership in 1996.  In turn, the Liberals were reduced to a minority government as a result of the 1997 election, following another record two-party swing in the other direction of 9.5 percent.

A 1994 Torrens by-election saw Labor take the seat from the Liberals. The 1994 Elizabeth by-election and 1994 Taylor by-election saw Labor retain both seats.

Legislative Council

|}

Seats changing hands

 Members in italics did not recontest their seats.
 Martyn Evans was elected as an Independent in 1989, then joined Labor in 1993. Pre-election margin is vs. Labor, after margin is vs. Liberal.
 The new district of Hart was largely based on the abolished district of Semaphore, which had been won by Norm Peterson as an Independent in 1989.
 Don Hopgood was the sitting MP for the abolished district of Baudin, which was largely replaced by Kaurna.
 Kevin Hamilton was the sitting Labor MP for the abolished district of Albert Park, which took in parts of the new district of Lee.
 Susan Lenehan instead contested the seat of Reynell and lost.
 Paul Holloway instead contested the seat of Elder and lost.
 John Klunder was the sitting Labor MP for the abolished district of Todd, which took in most of the new district of Torrens.
 The new district of Wright was largely based on the abolished district of Briggs. The sitting Briggs MP Mike Rann instead contested the seat of Ramsay and won.

Redistribution affected seats

 Heini Becker contested the seat of Peake and won.
 Terry Groom was elected as a Labor member in 1989 but quit the party in 1991. He contested the seat of Napier and lost.

Post-election pendulum

See also
 Candidates of the South Australian state election, 1993
 Members of the South Australian House of Assembly, 1993-1997
 Members of the South Australian Legislative Council, 1993-1997
 Results of the South Australian state election, 1993 (House of Assembly)
 Results of the 1993 South Australian state election (Legislative Council)
 Previous election: 1989 South Australian state election
 Next election: 1997 South Australian state election

Notes

References
 1993 election maps and results: Antony Green ABC archive
History of South Australian elections 1857-2006, volume 1: ECSA

Political parties
Australian Labor Party
Liberal Party of Australia
Australian Greens
Australian Democrats
The Nationals

Elections in South Australia
South Australian state election
1990s in South Australia
South Australian state election